The Legend of Three Kingdoms is a video game series originally developed by OdinSoft, later by UserJoy Technology. The series includes seven PC-based single-player titles and three online and one mobile titles, which have been released in China, Japan, South Korea, Russia, the United States, and South Asia. The backdrop for the plot comes from Luo Guanzhong's 14th century novel, Romance of the Three Kingdoms.

Series
Single-Player PC games
The Legend of Three Kingdoms (1998)
The Legend of Three Kingdoms II (1999)
The Legend of Three Kingdoms III (2001)
The Legend of Three Kingdoms IV (2002)
The Legend of Three Kingdoms V (2005) 
The Legend of Three Kingdoms VI (2006)
The Legend of Three Kingdoms VII (2007)
The Legend of Three Kingdoms VIII (2021)

Online games
The Legend of Three Kingdoms Online (2004)
The Legend of Three Kingdoms 2 Online (2009)
The Legend of Three Kingdoms Web (2014 browser game)

Mobile games
The Legend of Three Kingdoms (2015)

References

External links
Products of UserJoy Technology

Video games developed in Taiwan
Video game franchises introduced in 1998
Video game franchises
Video games based on Romance of the Three Kingdoms
Video games set in China